Mithila Bihari (Nepali: मिथिला बिहारी) is a municipality in Danusha District in Madhesh Pradesh of Nepal. It was formed in 2016 occupying current 10 sections (wards) from previous 10 VDCs. It occupies an area of 37.60 km2 with a total population of 37,276.

References 

Populated places in Dhanusha District
Nepal municipalities established in 2017
Municipalities in Madhesh Province